Macaulay v Schroeder Music Publishing Co Ltd [1974] 1 WLR 1308 is an English contract law decision of the House of Lords relating to restraint of trade.

Facts
Macaulay, a novice songwriter aged 21, entered a standard form agreement with Schroeder Music, whereby they would have the exclusive benefit of his compositions. The global copyright was assigned to another party in return for a fixed percentage of any royalties. This was to last five years and could be automatically extended for five years if the royalties went above £5000. Schroeder Music could terminate or assign the contract, but Macaulay could not, and Schroeder was under no obligation to publish or promote anything. Macaulay claimed the agreement was contrary to public policy.

Judgment
The House of Lords held the standard form agreement could not be justified as being purely moulded through negotiation, competition and public opinion. Macaulay had no bargaining power. The defendants purported to be able to arbitrarily decline to exploit the plaintiff's work in which event the plaintiff's remuneration under the agreement would be limited to a £50 advance payable thereunder during the five-year period. The defendants' power to assign precluded the argument that the restrictions would not be enforced oppressively. The defendants had failed to justify restrictions which appeared unnecessary and capable of oppressive enforcement.

Lord Diplock said the following.

Lord Reid, Viscount Dilhorne, Lord Kilbrandon and Lord Simon also sat on the case.

See also

English contract law
Esso Petroleum Co Ltd v Harper's Garage (Stourport) Ltd [1968] A.C. 269

Notes

English contract case law
House of Lords cases
1974 in British law
1974 in case law